Chincha Baja District is one of eleven districts of the province Chincha in Peru.

History
Chincha Baja is the oldest district of the province and the entire region. It was created with the name of "Villa Santiago de Almagro" on October 20, 1537, by the conquistador Diego de Almagro. During the Pacific War it served as the headquarters of the Chileans. Within its boundaries is the administrative center of Chincha kingdom, known as Huaca "The Sentinel".

The district was created in the early years of the Republic of Peru.

References

1537 establishments in the Spanish Empire